The following table of United States cities by crime rate is based on Federal Bureau of Investigation Uniform Crime Reports statistics from 2019 for the 100 most populous cities in America that have reported data to the FBI UCR system.

The population numbers are based on U.S. Census estimates for the year end. The number of murders includes nonnegligent manslaughter. This list is based on the reporting. In most cases, the city and the reporting agency are identical. However, in some cases such as Charlotte, Honolulu, and Las Vegas, the reporting agency has more than one municipality.

Murder is the only statistic that all agencies are required to report. Consequently, some agencies do not report all the crimes. If components are missing the total is adjusted to 0.

Note about population
Often, one obtains very different results depending on whether crime rates are measured for the city jurisdiction or the metropolitan area.

Information is voluntarily submitted by each jurisdiction and some jurisdictions do not appear in the table because they either did not submit data or they did not meet deadlines.

The FBI website has this disclaimer on population estimates:

For the 2019 population estimates used in this table, the FBI computed individual rates of growth from one year to the next for every city/town and county using 2010 decennial population counts and 2011 through 2018 population estimates from the U.S. Census Bureau. Each agency’s rates of growth were averaged; that average was then applied and added to its 2018 Census population estimate to derive the agency’s 2019 population estimate.

It should also be mentioned that the FBI has recently switched its data reporting mechanism and currently some major metropolitan police departments (e.g. Baltimore) have not been included in the total.

Crime rates

Notes:

1 The figures are shown in this column for the offense of rape were reported using only the revised Uniform Crime Reporting (UCR) definition of rape. See the data declaration for further explanation. 
2 The FBI does not publish arson data unless it receives data from either the agency or the state for all 12 months of the calendar year. 
3 The population for the city of Mobile, Alabama, includes 55,819 inhabitants from the jurisdiction of the Mobile County Sheriff's Department. 
4 Because of changes in the state/local agency's reporting practices, figures are not comparable to previous years' data. 
5 The FBI determined that the agency's data were underreported. Consequently, those data are not included in this table. 
6 Arson offenses are also reported by the Louisville Fire Department. Those figures are not included in this table. 
7 Arson offenses are reported by the Toledo Fire Department; therefore, those figures are not included in this report. 
8 This agency/state submits rape data classified according to the legacy UCR definition; therefore the rape offense and violent crime total, which rape is a part of, is not included in this table. See the data declaration for further explanation.

Criticism of ranking crime data 
The FBI web site recommends against using its data for ranking because these rankings lead to simplistic and/or incomplete analyses that often create misleading perceptions adversely affecting cities and counties, along with their residents. The FBI web site also recommends against using its data to judge how effective law enforcement agencies are, since there are many factors that influence crime rates other than law enforcement.

In November 2007, the executive board of the American Society of Criminology (ASC) went further than the FBI itself, and approved a resolution opposing not only the use of the ratings to judge police departments, but also opposing any development of city crime rankings from FBI Uniform Crime Reports (UCRs) at all. The resolution opposed these rankings on the grounds that they "fail to account for the many conditions affecting crime rates" and "divert attention from the individual and community characteristics that elevate crime in all cities", though it did not provide sources or further elaborate on these claims. The resolution states the rankings "represent an irresponsible misuse of the data and do groundless harm to many communities" and "work against a key goal of our society, which is a better understanding of crime-related issues by both scientists and the public".

The U.S. Conference of Mayors passed a similar statement, which also committed the Conference to working with the FBI and the U.S. Department of Justice "to educate reporters, elected officials, and citizens on what the (UCR) data means and doesn't mean."

Criticism of comparing crime rates 

Crime rates per capita might also be biased by population size depending on the crime type. This misrepresentation occurs because rates per capita assume that crime increases at the same pace as the number of people in an area. When this linear assumption does not hold, rates per capita still have population effects. In these nonlinear cases, per capita rates can inflate or deflate the representation of crime in cities, introducing an artifactual bias into rankings. Therefore, it is necessary to test for linearity before comparing crime rates of cities of different sizes.

See also
 Crime in the United States
 Demographics of the United States
 List of U.S. states by homicide rate
 List of cities by murder rate
 Homicide in world cities

References

External links
Murder rate by U.S. state, highest to lowest

Crime rates in the United States

Crime rate 2014
Cities